Gazani-ye Taj Mohammad (also Romanized as Gazānī-ye Tāj Moḩammad; also known as Gazāfī Tāj Moḩammad, Gazānī-e Bālā, Gazānī-ye Bālā, and Gozānī Bālā) is a village in Polan Rural District, Polan District, Chabahar County, Sistan and Baluchestan Province, Iran. At the 2006 census, its population was 396, in 80 families.

References 

Populated places in Chabahar County